Sheppey  may refer to:

 Isle of Sheppey, on the north Kent coast
 Municipal Borough of Queenborough-in-Sheppey
 Sittingbourne and Sheppey (UK Parliament constituency)
 Sheppey Crossing
 Sheppey Light Railway
 A.F.C. Sheppey
 River Sheppey, in Somerset
 Sheppey Corner, in Gloucestershire
 John Sheppey (1300–1360), English administrator and bishop
 Sheppey (play), a 1933 play by William Somerset Maugham
 Sheppey, a humorous unit of measure

See also 
 Shepway (disambiguation)